North West Wales refers to an area or region of Wales, commonly defined as a grouping of the principal areas of Conwy County Borough, Gwynedd and the Isle of Anglesey in the north-west of the country. These principal areas make up the entire preserved county of Gwynedd, and parts of Clwyd. It is bordered by Denbighshire, in North East Wales to the east, Powys, and Ceredigion in Mid Wales to the south, and the Irish sea to the north and west (as Cardigan Bay). It is the more mountainous, rural, and sparsely populated part of the north Wales geographic region.

Settlements include: Bangor, Caernarfon, Colwyn Bay, Holyhead, Llandudno, and Pwllheli. The port of Holyhead serves as the major sea link between Wales and the Republic of Ireland. Snowdonia National Park is located wholly in the area, hosting Snowdon, the largest peak in Britain and Ireland excluding the Scottish Highlands. The area also hosts AONBs (Area of Outstanding Natural Beauty) in the Llŷn Peninsula and Isle of Anglesey, and the Castles and Town Walls of King Edward UNESCO World Heritage Site.

Usage and definition
The term North West Wales is used by the Welsh Government in the Wales Spatial Plan and the BBC.

See also
South West Wales
North East Wales
Mid Wales
South East Wales

References

Regions of Wales